Rolf Johan Witting (30 September 1879 in Viipuri – 11 October 1944 in Porvoon maalaiskunta) was a Finnish oceanographist and politician, member of four of Finland's cabinets 1924–1943.

Scientific career
Witting graduated as Abitur in 1897, Candidate of Philosophy in 1901, Master of Philosophy in 1907, Licentiate 1909 and Doctor of Philosophy in 1910.  He served as the director-general of the Finnish Institute of Marine Research from 1918–1936.

Politics
He was elected as a Member of Parliament on 1 May 1924 from Uusimaa constituency. He was deputy minister for Foreign Affairs 1934–1936, and the Minister of Foreign Affairs 1937–1943.

Witting served in business life as a head of corporate government in the Hanken School of Economics, the Delegation of the Finnish Academies of Science and Letters and the Geographical Society of Finland. Also he was as a member of corporate government in Teollisuushypoteekkipankki, Suomen pankkiyhdistys and Hufvudstadsbladet.

References

1879 births
1944 deaths
Politicians from Vyborg
People from Viipuri Province (Grand Duchy of Finland)
Swedish-speaking Finns
Finnish people of German descent
Swedish People's Party of Finland politicians
Ministers for Foreign Affairs of Finland
Members of the Parliament of Finland (1924–27)
Finnish people of World War II
Continuation War
University of Helsinki alumni
World War II political leaders